Villa Elvira Airport  is a public use airport serving the Mamoré Province in the Beni Department of Bolivia.

See also

Transport in Bolivia
List of airports in Bolivia

References

External links 
OpenStreetMap - Villa Elvira
OurAirports - Villa Elvira
Fallingrain - Villa Elvira Airport

Airports in Beni Department